Sherlyn Chopra (born 11 February 1987 )) is an Indian actress and model who worked in Hindi films. In July 2012, Chopra became the first Indian woman to pose nude for Playboy magazine. The photos were released two years later. She was then selected to host the sixth season of the show MTV Splitsvilla. In December 2013, she released her music single titled "Bad Girl". She was a contestant in the reality show Bigg Boss in 2009.

Early life
Chopra was born in Hyderabad, India to a Christian father and a Muslim mother. Her father was a doctor. She attended Stanley Girls High School and Saint Ann's College for Women in Secunderabad. In 1999 she was crowned "Miss Andhra".

Career

Chopra's early acting career consisted of roles in Bollywood films. She appeared in movies such as Time Pass, Red Swastik and Game. She made her Telugu film debut in A Film by Aravind . Chopra was also a contestant on Bigg Boss. She was evicted from the show on Day 27. From 2013 on, she filmed as the lead protagonist in Kamasutra 3D, directed by Rupesh Paul, and she also appeared in the trailer which was released at the 66th Cannes International Film Festival.
After a one day shoot, Ms. Sherlyn Chopra walked out of Kamasutra 3D.

Filmography

Film

Television

Discography

See also
 List of people in Playboy 2010–2020

References

External links

 
 Sherlyn Chopra on Instagram 
 Sherlyn Chopra on twitter 
 

Living people
Indian film actresses
Indian beauty pageant winners
Actresses from Hyderabad, India
Actresses in Hindi cinema
21st-century Indian actresses
Female models from Hyderabad, India
Bigg Boss (Hindi TV series) contestants
Year of birth missing (living people)